Christophe Salomon (born in 1953) is a French physicist. Specialist in quantum optics and cold atoms, Christophe Salomon is interested in the superfluidity of quantum gases and in the measurement of time using atomic clocks. A pioneer in this disciplinary field, he has helped to give France a world leadership position in the field.

Biography 
From 1973 to 1976, he was a student at the École centrale des arts et manufactures in Paris. He then defended his postgraduate thesis in 1979. He joined the CNRS in 1980 as a research fellow at the Laser Physics Laboratory, University of Paris-Nord.

In 1984, he completed a thesis in high-resolution laser spectroscopy and then embarked on a post-doctoral fellowship at JILA, University of Colorado (USA).

Fascinated by the first work in the United States on the manipulation of objects and atoms by laser, Christophe Salomon was introduced to these new techniques at the University of Colorado, before joining the first research group in France on cold atoms, created by Claude Cohen-Tannoudji at the École normale supérieure (ENS). He is currently CNRS research director at the Kastler Brossel laboratory. "As a physicist and experimenter, I appreciate the privilege of being able to work in total freedom on exploratory subjects and the profound joy of discovery when the signals sought in a team, after several months of hard work, appear for the first time on a computer screen! »

In 1985, he was a CNRS research fellow at the Kaslter Brossel laboratory, École normale supérieure de Paris. In 2000, he became research director at the CNRS, head of the "Cold Atoms" group with Jean Dalibard and, in 2008, head of the "Ultra-Cold Fermi Gas" group at the Kastler Brossel laboratory (ENS).

Scientific work 
Cooled by light very close to absolute zero, atomic gases have very low thermal agitation, and can be used to measure time, space and gravitation with high accuracy. In collaboration with André Clairon, Christophe Salomon developed the first cesium clock operating as an atomic fountain. These ultra-precise clocks are now the foundation of international atomic time and advanced technologies such as GPS. Christophe Salomon has also been involved in the European space project ACES/PHARAO. This project aims to study the functioning of atomic clocks in space, in the absence of gravity, in order to carry out more precise tests of Einstein's general relativity.

Below the microkelvin, atoms also reveal spectacular quantum behaviours, such as Bose-Einstein condensation or superfluidity, the transport of particles without friction. Christophe Salomon and his team were the first to observe the Bloch oscillations of ultra cold atoms and the solitons of matter waves. They also played a decisive role in understanding the relationship between the superfluidity of Cooper pairs for attractive interacting fermions and the Bose-Einstein condensation of these strongly related pairs. This work paved the way for quantitative N-body physics in the regime of strong correlations, a subject that is currently undergoing rapid development.

He has written and co-authored nearly 150 scientific articles in peer-reviewed journals.

Honours and awards 

    1988. Science and Defence Young Researcher Award
    1993. European Time-Frequency Prices
    1993. Philip Morris Prize: Cold Atom Clocks
    2000 Mergier-Bourdeix Prize from the Academy of Sciences
    2005. Three Physicists Prize (ENS): quantum gases, cold atom clocks.
    2009. Winner of an Advanced Grant from the European Research Council ERC
    2011. Gay-Lussac Humboldt Award
    2011. Jules Haag Medal from the French Society of Microtechnology and Chronometry
    2012: Grand Prix Louis D. de l'Institut de France
    2014. Fellow of the American Physical Society
    2014. Galileo Ferraris Memorial lecture Award, INRIM (IT)
    2017 Member of the French Academy of Sciences
    2017. Winner of a senior fellowship from the European Research Council of the EU (2017-2022)

References

1953 births
Living people
French physicists
Research directors of the French National Centre for Scientific Research
Members of the French Academy of Sciences
Academic staff of the École Normale Supérieure